The 2020–21 UIC Flames men's basketball team represented the University of Illinois at Chicago in the 2020–21 NCAA Division I men's basketball season. The Flames, led by first-year head coach Luke Yaklich, played their home games at Credit Union 1 Arena in Chicago, Illinois as members of the Horizon League.

Previous season
They finished the season 18–17, 10–8 in Horizon League to play to finish in a tie for fourth place. As the No. 4 seed in the Horizon League tournament, they defeated IUPUI, Youngstown State, and top-seeded Wright State to advance to the championship game. There they lost to Northern Kentucky.

Offseason

Departures

Incoming transfers

Recruiting class of 2020

Roster

Schedule and results
On November 25, 2020, UIC announced that fans would not be permitted to attend home games for their first two home games. However, they did leave open the possibility to allow fans for future events.

|-
!colspan=9 style=| Non-conference regular season

|-
!colspan=9 style=| Horizon League regular season

|-
!colspan=9 style=| Horizon League tournament
|-

|-

Source

References

UIC Flames men's basketball seasons
UIC Flames
UIC Flames men's basketball
UIC Flames men's basketball